Brenda Bazinet (born July 18, 1956) is a Canadian actress. She is a recipient of the Gemini Award and has been nominated four times for the Dora Mavor Moore Award.

Bazinet was born in 1956 in Saskatchewan and grew up there. She attended high school in Stoughton, after which she studied fine arts at the University of Regina.

Bazinet and two friends founded the 5 & Dime Productions theater company in 1985. She has also taught at Actors Workshop, Actraworks, Citadel Theatre/Banff Professional Theatre Program, George Brown Theatre School, Humber College, and Ryerson University.

She won a Gemini Award for Best Actress in a Television Film or Miniseries at the 6th Gemini Awards in 1992, for her performance in an episode of the drama anthology series Saying Goodbye.

Select credits
33 Brompton Place (1982)
Siege (1983) as Barbara
In This Corner (1986) as Heather
Alex: The Life of a Child (1986) as Barbara Keator
Dancing in the Dark (1986) as Susan
Martha, Ruth and Edie (1988) as Alice
Saying Goodbye (1990) - Episode "A Grief Shared"
To Catch a Killer (1992) as Alice Pearson
Thicker Than Blood: The Larry McLinden Story (1994) as Mary
A Holiday to Remember (1995) as Eve Stevens
Hidden in America (1996) as Food Bank Worker
Lethal Vows (1999) as Dr. Addington
Sins of the Father (2002) as Virginia Cherry
Redemption: The Stan Tookie Williams Story (2004) as Barbara's Agent
Rabbittown (2006) as Harriet
Burn Up (2008) as Marianne
Shoot the Messenger (2016) as Susan Reeves
Anne with an E (2017-2018) as Jeannie
Utopia Falls (2020) as Gran Riel

References

External links
 

Living people
20th-century Canadian actresses
21st-century Canadian actresses
Canadian film actresses
Canadian television actresses
Canadian stage actresses
Canadian Screen Award winners
University of Regina alumni
Actresses from Saskatchewan
1956 births